Zapolosny is a rural locality (a khutor) in Mikhaylovka Urban Okrug, Volgograd Oblast, Russia. The population was 13 as of 2010.

Geography 
Zapolosny is located 21 km west of Mikhaylovka. Otruba is the nearest rural locality.

References 

Rural localities in Mikhaylovka urban okrug